Maarit Sihvonen (born 16 February 1961) is a Finnish breaststroke, freestyle and medley swimmer. She competed in three events at the 1984 Summer Olympics.

References

External links
 

1961 births
Living people
Finnish female breaststroke swimmers
Finnish female freestyle swimmers
Finnish female medley swimmers
Olympic swimmers of Finland
Swimmers at the 1984 Summer Olympics
Sportspeople from North Ostrobothnia